Kanda Station may refer to:
Kanda Station (Tokyo) (神田駅) on the Yamanote Line and Keihin-Tohoku Line, etc.
Kanda Station (Fukuoka) (苅田駅) on the Nippo Main Line